Agfacolor was the name of a series of color film products made by Agfa of Germany. The first Agfacolor, introduced in 1932, was a film-based version of their Agfa-Farbenplatte (Agfa color plate), a "screen plate" product similar to the French Autochrome. In late 1936, Agfa introduced Agfacolor Neu (New Agfacolor), a pioneering color film of the general type still in use today. The new Agfacolor was originally a reversal film used for making "slides", home movies and short documentaries. By 1939, it had also been adapted into a negative film and a print film for use by the German motion picture industry. After World War II, the Agfacolor brand was applied to several varieties of color negative film for still photography, in which the negatives were used to make color prints on paper. The reversal film was then marketed as Agfachrome.  These films use Color Developing Agent 1 in their color developer.

Agfacolor Neu, called simply Agfacolor after its predecessor had been retired, was the German response to Technicolor and Kodachrome. Like Kodachrome, introduced by Eastman Kodak in 1935, the new Agfacolor film was an "integral tripack" with three differently color-sensitized emulsion layers. Unlike Kodachrome, the corresponding color-forming dye couplers were made integral with each layer during manufacture, greatly simplifying the processing of the film: with Kodachrome, the dye couplers had to be introduced one at a time during a very complicated development procedure that required special equipment and could only be done at a Kodak processing plant.

History

Development 
Realizing they were at least one year behind their American competitors, German technicians decided to steer away from Kodak’s approach to capturing color images on film and invested in their own technology. Their work bore fruits in the summer of 1936, when chemical engineers of the Agfa company in Germany tested their new material Agfacolor at the swimming competition of the 1936 Summer Olympics in Berlin. Although the German technology promised the use of one and the same material for different purposes, ranging from photographic negative film for prints to photographic slides and motion picture films, it took another three years—until July 1939—for any German motion picture film studio to experiment with the film.

Early use in German motion picture films
The Third Reich's Minister of Propaganda Joseph Goebbels admired Hollywood movies and examined them carefully in regular private screenings (sometimes with Adolf Hitler and his staff). Technicolor films such as The Garden of Allah (1936), Gone with the Wind (1939) and Disney's Snow White and the Seven Dwarfs (1937) made him realize that Hollywood feature films presented a threat to Germany's internal market, and that Hollywood's dominance of color film technology should be matched, at least if Germany was serious about engaging in a cultural war with the US and Britain.

Women Are Better Diplomats
It was not until the beginning of principal photography for Women Are Better Diplomats (German: Frauen sind doch bessere Diplomaten) a 1939 musical starring the singer/dancer Marika Rökk and actor Willy Fritsch that Agfacolor was used for a major motion picture. The use of Agfacolor was reinforced by the top of the Nazi film industry, Reichsminister Joseph Goebbels, and the executives at UFA eventually gave in to his pressure. Agfacolor was then used throughout the entire film shoot of Women Are Better Diplomats.

Throughout the shoot, the film yielded mixed results as it was still very sensitive to different color temperatures caused by solar altitude at different times of day. Thus, outdoor shots were difficult to handle: A lawn in front of a castle appeared completely yellow, later brown, then bluish. The technology was not fully developed, and Agfa labs were virtually using the shooting of the film as testing grounds for their new stock, continually changing the formula throughout the shoot based upon unsatisfactory results, so that entire scenes had to be repeated once a new formula was being tested.

More than two years after its start date, Women Are Better Diplomats opened in October 1941.

The Golden City 
After the process's growing pains had been overcome throughout the production of Women Are Better Diplomats, the following Agfacolor movies were shot and printed much quicker and with better results. The technology was improved at a rapid pace. Veit Harlan was allowed to shoot his next picture in Agfacolor. Between the summers of 1941 and 1942, Veit Harlan finished Die goldene Stadt (Eng: The Golden City), a dreamy propaganda fairytale starring his wife Kristina Söderbaum as a young, innocent country girl who comes to the golden city of Prague and is seduced by an unscrupulous gigolo.

The Golden City premièred at the Venice Film Festival in September 1942 and was awarded for its outstanding technical quality, and actress Kristina Söderbaum won an acting award. Shot by cameraman Werner Krien, who had done black-and-white pictures before, and assisted by special effects specialist Konstantin Irmen-Tschet (once in charge of the SFX camera in Fritz Lang’s Metropolis), the film displays an impressive symphony of colors.

Later Agfacolor films during the Third Reich 

Made for UFA's 25th Anniversary, Münchhausen (1943) was the third German feature film – out of over a dozen – to be produced using Agfacolor film between 1939 and 1945. Other Agfacolor productions include The Woman of My Dreams (1944), a musical starring Marika Rökk and Kolberg (1945), a dramatization of German resistance throughout the Napoleonic Wars and the regime's last major propaganda feature film.  A significant number of Agfacolor movies shot between 1939 and 1945 survived the war, but most of them exist only in fragments today.

Legacy of World War II 

Towards the end of World War II, large quantities of raw Agfacolor stock were seized by the Soviet Union and served as the basis for the Sovcolor process, which was widely used in the USSR and other Eastern bloc nations; such films produced in Poland were also described as Polcolor, the first being Adventure in Warsaw (1955). One of the best-known Sovcolor films is War and Peace (1965–67) and many of Andrei Tarkovsky's films used it as well. Sovcolor was known for the variable quality of its colors, which led to continuity errors as colors changed between scenes; more prestigious productions used imported Eastman Kodak stock instead.

After the war, Agfa's former production plant at Wolfen was located in the Soviet occupation zone which was to become East Germany. After the war, the Wolfen plant continued producing Agfacolor films, until in 1964 East Germany lost the licence to the Agfa brand name. From 1964 onwards, the plant was renamed ORWO (short for Original Wolfen), producing color films under the name of ORWOcolor.

Agfacolor consumer products were also marketed in North America under the names Ansco Color and Anscochrome (from Agfa's then-US subsidiary, Agfa-Ansco). Prior to World War II, the film had been imported from Germany. After the War began, the American subsidiary was seized by the US Government. At the request of the War Department, Ansco then developed a similar color film, which it produced in its own factory in Binghamton, New York. Anscochrome was widely distributed, but met with limited commercial success in competition with Kodak product.

Ansco Color was also used in Hollywood films, including some produced by Metro-Goldwyn-Mayer.  Films shot in Ansco Color included The Man on the Eiffel Tower (1949), Bwana Devil (1953), Kiss Me, Kate (1953), Seven Brides for Seven Brothers (1954), Brigadoon (1954), and Lust for Life (1956), the final film shot on this film stock.  Anscochrome films for still photography were manufactured until 1977.

Agfacolor during the Second World War

Famous professional early works made in Agfacolor were war photo reports made during Invasion of Poland (1939) by Hugo Jaeger; Paris during German occupation (1940-1944) by André Zucca; Warsaw Ghetto Uprising (1943) by Zbigniew Borowczyk (3 photos) and Karol Grabski (1 photo); Warsaw Uprising (1944) by Ewa Faryaszewska; Prague uprising (1945) by Oldřich Cerha and during Hungarian Revolution of 1956 by Jeno Kiss. All of works excluding Jaeger were made by resistance members active against their occupants. All photographs survived in excellent condition.

In 1978, Agfa ceased production of color film based upon the original Agfacolor process, switching to Kodak's C-41 process.

Notes

References

Coe Brian, Colour Photography: The First Hundred Years 1840–1940, Ash & Grant, 1978
Gert & Nina Koshofer, Dr. Rolf Giesen, Friedrich-Wilhelm-Murnau-Stiftung, Wiesbaden, 2005
www.pixpast.com a source for collectors of original 35mm and 16mm agfacolor film from 1936 to 1945.

External links 
 Agfacolor on Timeline of Historical Film Colors with many written resources and many photographs of Agfacolor prints.

Photographic films
Agfa